Omar Portee, also known as OG Mack (born c. 1969) is an American gang leader, known for founding the One Eight Trey Gangsters and United Blood Nation while serving time at Rikers Island.

Background 
In the early hours of August 16th, 1987, Portee claimed to have witnessed Don Taylor shoot and kill Terrance Joyner in Bronx, New York. Based on Portee's eyewitness testimony, Taylor was convicted on April 25, 1989 and sentenced to 22½ years to life. At the time of his original testimony, Portee was facing multiple charges in New York stemming from his arrest on August 31, 1987. Portee faced substantial prison time, 16⅔ to 50 years, if convicted. Instead, as part of a cooperation agreement, which included his testimony against Don Taylor in People v Taylor, Portee was allowed to plead to two to six years for all charged crimes (two 1st-degree robbery convictions), received credit for 21 months' time served and was promised a favorable letter to the parole board. He started serving his sentence on June 9, 1989. He was released on June 20, 1990. Portee later recanted his prior testimony, and Taylor's conviction was vacated in 2004, whereupon Taylor was released from prison after having served over 10 years.

Portee and fellow inmate Leonard "OG Dead Eye" McKenzie established the United Blood Nation while incarcerated in 1993, which was responsible for spreading gang violence from Los Angeles to New York City. Portee was released from jail in 1999 and returned to the streets to build the Bloods into a powerful street gang.

Branches were created in different areas of the city, such as 1-8 Trey (The Bronx), 9 Trey Gangsters (citywide), Valentine Gang (The Bronx), Sex Money Murder (The Bronx), Grenade Gang (The Bronx), and G-Shine (Brooklyn). He was convicted of ten counts of criminal activity, including racketeering, murder, conspiracy, credit card fraud, and drug trafficking, on August 27, 2002. He was sentenced to 50 years and is currently incarcerated in ADX Florence in Fremont County, Colorado. In 2021, Portee was moved from ADX to United States Penitentiary, Florence High, in the ADX step-down program. As of January 2022, Portee is back at ADX.

In 2018, Portee was profiled in an episode of the documentary series Gangsters: America's Most Evil.

References

1969 births
Living people
African-American gangsters
American gangsters
American drug traffickers
American people convicted of murder
Bloods
Gang members
Gangsters from New York City
Criminals from the Bronx
American people convicted of fraud
Inmates of ADX Florence
21st-century African-American people
20th-century African-American people